Giovanni Lucchi (21 August 1942, in Cesena, Italy – 2 August 2012, in Cremona, Italy) was an Italian bow maker noted for founding the first school of bow making in Italy.

Background
Giovanni Lucchi trained as a double bassist, graduating from the Conservatorio Statale di Musica "Gioachino Rossini" in Pesaro in 1963.  He worked for several years as a musician and instructor, and in 1971, he began constructing and restoring bows.  He went to Brienz, Switzerland to apprentice under S. Finkel.

Career
In 1976, Lucchi founded a school for bowmaking in Cremona, Italy, where he taught courses in bow construction, maintenance and restoration, as well as style and design.

In 1983, Lucchi invented the Lucchi Meter, a device used to measure the speed of sound in wood that has become a standard tool not only for bow makers. The LucchiMeter is used to give the right price to the pieces of tonewood.

Lucchi was active within the community of luthiers and bow makers, holding various posts among professional societies and writing and speaking often in journals and conferences relating to the art.

Pupils
Maestro Lucchi Giovanni had a lot pupils, many of whom later became significant artists in their own right, here a little partial list:
Emilio Slaviero, Daniel Tobias Navea Vera, Pietro Cavalazzi, Giorgio Grisales, Francisco Gonzalez Espinoza, Octavio Aranda, Andreas Grütter, Llorenç Fenollosa, Zheng Quan, Arturo Moreno, Juliane Schanzenbach, Paolo Pamiro, Andrea Proietti, Arturo Ponce, Gastaldi Marco Maria e Ivan Delgado.

Professional activities
 Secretary, Italian Association of Violin and Bow Makers (1991 to 1992)
 President, Violin and Bow Makers of the Artisans' Association of the Province of Cremona (1991 to 1998)
 Representative for Cremona to the Triennale Assembly (1995 - 1998)
 Member of the European Association of Master Violin and Bow Makers (1996 - 2000)

Publications
 
 
 
 
 Lucchi, Giovanni (1996). The Bow, Multimedia CD-ROM

Reputation
Lucchi's reputation was such that he was the bow maker for artists such as Mstislav Rostropovich, Pinchas Zukerman and Gary Karr, among others.

Lucchi Foundation
The “Fondazione Lucchi” comes from the desire to continue the work of the Bowmaker Maestro Giovanni Lucchi. Those who knew him knows he loved to share the culture of handcraft and his discoveries.
One of his great project was to create a foundation that would promote research, discovery about materials, knowledge of the violin bow.
We’ve made in his memory, because the cultural legacy he left us can get to many people in all parts of the world, as he wished.

References

External links
 Personal Page
 Lucchi Foundation Site

Bow makers
1942 births
2012 deaths